Grave Disorder is the ninth studio album from the punk rock band The Damned, released in August 2001. It was their first release since signing to Nitro Records and only studio album with Patricia Morrison.

Style
The album is musically similar to Dave Vanian and Captain Sensible's previous Damned collaboration, Strawberries. It uses a combination of modern sampling and looping ("Absinthe"), gothic rock ("Thrill Kill"), punk rock ("Neverland", "Obscene" and "Amen"), deep gothic piano pieces ("Beauty of the Beast" and "The End of Time"), and more traditional pop songs.  The song "Lookin' for Action" appeared on the Warped Tour 2002 Tour Compilation.

Songs like "W" (about the 2000 election and George W. Bush) have a sound very reminiscent of Britpop (such as the sound they exhibited on Strawberries). "song.com" offers a tongue-in-cheek commentary on the Internet, while "Democracy?" offers a rebuke of what they see as the futility of democracy and political revolution.

The album's name is taken parliamentary convention in the United Kingdom, where a sitting may be adjourned should 'grave disorder' break out among members.

Track listing
Songwriting credits adapted from the album's liner notes.

"Democracy?" (Captain Sensible) – 3:21
"song.com"  (Sensible, David Vanian) – 3:39
"Thrill Kill" (Sensible, Pinch) – 5:37
"She" (Sensible, Vanian) – 4:27
"Lookin for Action" (Sensible, Vanian, Monty Oxy Moron, Patricia Morrison, Pinch) – 4:04
"Would You Be So Hot (If You Weren't Dead?)" (Sensible) – 4:13
"Absinthe" (Vanian) – 4:17
"Amen" (Sensible, Pinch) – 7:55
"Neverland" (Sensible) – 3:31
"'Til the End of Time" (Sensible) – 3:51
"Obscene" (Sensible, Vanian) – 2:46
"W" (Pinch, Tom Savage) – 5:05
"Beauty of the Beast" (Vanian, Oxy Moron) – 4:44

Personnel
Credits adapted from the album's liner notes.

The Damned
David Vanian – vocals, theremin
Captain Sensible – guitar, backing vocals
Patricia Morrison – bass guitar, backing vocals
Monty Oxy Moron – keyboards, backing vocals
Pinch – drums, backing vocals
Technical
David Bianco – producer, mixing
Eddy Schreyer – mastering
Vince Ray – cover
Morat – photography

References 

The Damned (band) albums
2001 albums